Ridhima Pandit (born 25 June 1990) is an Indian actress and model who works in Hindi television. She is known for her role of Rajni in Life OK's Bahu Hamari Rajni Kant. In 2019, she participated in Fear Factor: Khatron Ke Khiladi 9 and became the 2nd runner-up. In 2021, she participated in Bigg Boss OTT.

Early life
Pandit was born on 25 June 1990 in Mumbai, Maharashtra, India to her Gujarati mother Jayshree and Maharashtrian father Pandit. Her father language is Marathi while her mother language is Gujarati.

Career

Modelling & debut (2016-2018) 

She started her career as a model and did modeling projects like Sunsilk, Fair & Lovely, Dove, Harpic, Veet, Luminous, Set Wet and many more.

In February 2016, Ridhima made her acting debut into Hindi television industry with Life OK's sitcom Bahu Hamari Rajni Kant. The show garnered her immense appreciation for the main role of Rajni, a super humanoid robot and earned her Gold Award for Best Debut Actress. The show ended in February 2017.

In 2017, She contested in Sony Entertainment Television's The Drama Company. Venturing into digital world, she appeared in Voot's web series Yo Ke Hua Bro. Star Plus signed her to host dance competition reality show Dance Champions that year.

After doing a cameo role in Big Magic's Deewane Anjane, she starred as the simple and sweet Devina Kapoor in ALT Balaji romantic web series Hum - I'm Because of Us created by Ekta Kapoor in 2018.

Khatron Ke Khiladi and beyond (2019–present) 

In 2019, Pandit participated in Colors TV's stunt-based reality show Fear Factor: Khatron Ke Khiladi 9 and became the second runner-up.

Collaborating with the channel consecutively for the second time, she appeared in the game comical show Khatra Khatra Khatra.

From August 2019 to February 2020, Ridhima portrayed Amrita Sharma in Zee TV's science fiction drama Haiwaan : The Monster produced by Kapoor. In 2021, she participated in Bigg Boss OTT and got evicted on Day 18 along with her connection Karan Nath.

Filmography

Television

Awards

References

External links

 
 

 

Actresses from Mumbai
Living people
21st-century Indian actresses
Indian television actresses
Actresses in Hindi television
Fear Factor: Khatron Ke Khiladi participants
Bigg Boss (Hindi TV series) contestants
1990 births